Elizabeth Sankey is a British filmmaker and musician, best known for her film Romantic Comedy. and for playing in the indie-pop band Summer Camp.

As part of Summer Camp she has released four albums and the soundtrack to the film Beyond Clueless.

Her debut feature film, Romantic Comedy, premiered at South By Southwest and was distributed in the UK by MUBI. It consists of clips from hundreds of pre-existing films, with narration by Sankey exploring the history of the genre, intercut with interviews with other contributors including Jessica Barden, Charlie Lyne and Laura Snapes

References

External links 

 

English television presenters
British women television presenters
English film critics
British women film critics
British bloggers
British women bloggers
1991 births
Living people